A Bicycle User Group (BUG or B.U.G.) is a group set up to promote cycling issues in, for example, a place of employment or a local government area. A BUG might be part of or affiliated with a bigger organization representing cyclists' interests at City or State level.

For example, the Group may lobby the employer or local authority to -
 install shower facilities in places of work
 install bicycle parking facilities 
 encourage motorists to respect cyclists
 construct bicycle paths and on-road bike lanes
 reduce speed limits on local roads or otherwise improve local roads for cyclists

The Group may encourage other members of the organisation or area to take up cycling. They may make special arrangements to assist new cyclists, such as -
 offering education and advice
 organizing group commuting bicycle buses
 a program of rides
 preparing maps of good routes.
 assistance in obtaining cycling grants
 community Bike Days

See also
Bicycle Network

External links
Bicycle Users Geelong
User Groups – Bicycle Institute SA